William Francis Andrew Duff (16 December 1938 — 25 March 2002) was an English professional footballer who played as a left winger in the Football League.

References

1938 births
2002 deaths
People from Littleborough, Greater Manchester
English footballers
Association football wingers
Rochdale A.F.C. players
Scunthorpe United F.C. players
Grimsby Town F.C. players
Accrington Stanley F.C. (1891) players
Runcorn F.C. Halton players
Rossendale United F.C. players
English Football League players
Expatriate soccer players in Canada